Nowruz or Navruz is may refer to the following notable people:

Given name
Nawrūz (Mongol emir) (died 1297), emir of the Ilkhanid era
Nawruz Beg (died 1361), Khan of the Blue Horde
Nowruz Beg (died 1640), Safavid official
Navruz Jurakobilov (born 1984), Uzbek judoka
Nawroz Mangal (born 1984), Afghanistan cricketer

Surname
Alp Navruz (born 1990), Turkish actor and model
Amu Nowruz, fictional figure in Iranian folklore